Staroilikovo (İśke İlek) is a rural locality (a selo) and the administrative centre of Ilikovsky Selsoviet, Blagoveshchensky District, Bashkortostan, Russia. The population was 356 as of 2010. There are 5 streets.

Geography 
Staroilikovo is located 51 km northeast of Blagoveshchensk (the district's administrative centre) by road. Gumerovo is the nearest rural locality.

References 

Rural localities in Blagoveshchensky District